Diacetylnalorphine (BAN), also known as O3,O6-diacetyl-N-allyl-normorphine, is an opioid drug described as an analgesic and antidote which was never marketed. It is the 3,6-diacetyl ester of nalorphine, and therefore the heroin analogue of nalorphine. Diacetylnalorphine may behave as a prodrug to nalorphine, similarly to the cases of heroin (diacetylmorphine) to morphine and diacetyldihydromorphine to dihydromorphine.

See also
 Nalorphine dinicotinate

References

Analgesics
Antidotes
Delta-opioid receptor antagonists
4,5-Epoxymorphinans
Kappa-opioid receptor agonists
Mu-opioid receptor antagonists
Semisynthetic opioids